Cooper Harris was a 22-month-old toddler who died of heat stroke on June 18, 2014, in Vinings, Georgia, a suburb of Atlanta, after being left strapped in the rear-facing car seat of his father's SUV for approximately seven hours. Though he has maintained that the death was a tragic accident, Cooper's father Justin Ross Harris was arrested and charged with his son's murder. On November 14, 2016, after a jury trial that garnered national media attention, Harris was found guilty of malice murder and felony murder among other charges, in a verdict that has faced some criticism. He was subsequently sentenced to life in prison without the possibility of parole plus 32 years. On June 22, 2022, Justin Ross Harris's convictions relating to Cooper's death were overturned by the Georgia Supreme Court, concluding that he had not received a fair trial, and will be given a retrial.

Justin Ross Harris 

Justin Harris, who goes by his middle name Ross, was born in 1980. He briefly worked as a police dispatcher in Tuscaloosa until 2009, according to police spokesman Sgt. Brent Blankley. Harris graduated from the University of Alabama in Tuscaloosa in 2012, receiving a bachelor's degree in commerce and business administration. From there, Harris moved to Georgia to work for The Home Depot as a web developer.

Incident
On the morning of June 18, 2014, Justin Ross Harris was supposed to take Cooper to daycare on his way to work. Harris and Cooper ate breakfast at a Chick-fil-A restaurant less than a mile from his office on Cumberland Parkway, near its intersection with Paces Ferry Road in Vinings, Georgia, at or around 8:57 A.M. After breakfast, Harris drove his SUV, a Hyundai Tucson, to the Home Depot office where he worked, with Cooper strapped in a rear-facing car seat in the back. He then entered the office at 9:25 A.M., leaving Cooper in his car seat.

At or around 12:30 P.M., Harris was picked up from work by two friends to have lunch at a nearby Publix. Following lunch, they proceeded to a nearby Home Depot located on Cumberland Parkway, where Harris purchased light bulbs. After his friends dropped him off at his workplace parking lot, he walked to his SUV, opened the driver's side door, and placed the bulbs inside. It is not known if Harris viewed Cooper in the back seat during this time though he was later charged with intentionally leaving his son inside the car to die, the child already being locked inside the hot car for three hours. Harris stammered and then skipped over his purchase of light bulbs when interviewed by the police.

At 4:16 P.M., approximately seven hours after initially leaving Cooper in the SUV, Harris returned to the vehicle and drove it away from his office. He had planned to visit an AMC movie theater to see 22 Jump Street with friends after work. After driving for a few minutes, he later claimed that he pulled into an outdoor mall parking lot to call for help and attempt CPR after discovering his son unresponsive in the back seat, although when a witness told Harris his son needed CPR, Harris went to the other side of his vehicle and made three phone calls, never calling 911, according to police.

Harris told police he forgot to drop his son off at daycare that morning, instead driving straight to his job as a web developer for Home Depot after forgetting that Cooper was still in his car seat. Temperatures that day reached 92 degrees Fahrenheit (33.33 degrees Celsius) (in the shade outside the car), and Cooper died while sitting for about seven hours in the back seat of Harris's vehicle.

Investigation
Investigation into the death of Cooper Harris focused heavily on his father's extramarital sexual affairs. Police had determined that Harris had been involved with multiple women, and on the day of Cooper's death had been texting sexually explicit messages ("sexting") (some sent with nude photos) with at least six recipients, some of whom were girls under the age of consent. This, along with how Harris acted after he pulled into a shopping center with his son and other allegations, helped lead police to believe that Harris had intentionally killed Cooper so that he would have been able to lead a "child free" existence. According to prosecutors,  just before abandoning his son Harris texted a woman saying "I love my son and all but we both need escapes."

Police viewed Leanna Harris, Cooper's mother, with suspicion early in the investigation, but ultimately ruled her out as a suspect.

In February 2016, Leanna Harris filed for divorce. After the divorce was finalized, she retained her maiden name, Leanna Taylor. In spite of the divorce, Leanna continued to defend her former husband's innocence regarding the charges of murder in Cooper's death.

Trial and conviction of Ross Harris
Justin Ross Harris's murder trial was held before Cobb County Superior Court Judge Mary Staley Clark, who, after nearly three weeks of jury selection, decided that pretrial publicity had made it too difficult to find a fair jury in Cobb County, where the boy died, and in April 2015 granted a defense request to relocate the trial. A jury in Glynn County, led by Cobb County Senior Assistant District Attorney Chuck Boring, spent about a month listening to evidence in the case and deliberated for four days.

The prosecution contended that Harris had intentionally left his son Cooper in the SUV to die so that he could be freed from his familial responsibilities and could pursue a carefree life of extramarital sexual affairs. The defense, led by Maddox Kilgore, admitted that Harris was responsible for Cooper's death, but only by his negligence in forgetting that Cooper was in the car. Eventually, Harris was found guilty of all eight counts against him. In addition to malice murder and felony murder charges, Harris was also found guilty of felony sexual exploitation of a minor in sending sexual text messages to a teenage girl and sending her nude photos.

Evidence presented by the prosecution included a video of Harris returning to the SUV at midday to put some lightbulbs into the front seat. In the video, it does not appear that Ross Harris looks into the vehicle, but police investigators contended that the stench of death had filled the car and that Harris must have noticed it, either at that point or when he drove the car away at the end of the day. On cross-examination, the officers admitted that they had not mentioned the stench until over a year after Cooper's death, and other witnesses at the scene said they did not notice a smell. Prosecutors also alleged that Harris had researched being “child-free” and child deaths in hot cars prior to the incident.

Harris's ex-wife, Cooper's mother, Leanna Taylor, testified on his behalf at his trial, stating that Harris had "destroyed" her life with his sexual affairs, but that he did not intentionally kill their son.

Harris was convicted of malice murder (amongst other charges) on November 14, 2016, and was sentenced to life imprisonment without parole plus 32 years.

Controversy and appeals
In the immediate aftermath of Cooper's death, a petition was published on Change.org urging authorities to drop charges against Harris. This petition included signatures from people who knew Harris personally, and included comments such as, "He has been nothing but a caring father and supporting husband." The petition was removed from publication shortly thereafter.

After Harris's conviction, his ex-wife Leanna Taylor continued to defend his innocence. In an interview with ABC News's Amy Robach in February 2017, she stated that she has always believed Cooper's death was an accident.

In January 2017, Harris's legal team filed a motion for a new trial with the trial court, arguing that prejudicial testimony (revelations of Harris's numerous affairs, and self-admitted sex addiction) "made it an absolute impossibility" for the (then) 36-year-old to receive a fair trial; however, as of September 2019, Harris's team was not prepared to go forward, not yet having read all of the thousands of pages of court transcripts.

Harris's first "appeal", being the motion for a new trial, was heard by the trial judge, Mary Staley Clark, beginning December 14, 2020, the judge denying the motion on May 20, 2021.
On January 18, 2022, the Supreme Court of Georgia, heard arguments for a new trial by Harris' lawyer Mitch Durham. “The sexual messaging acts did not make it more probable that Mr. Harris would intentionally kill his child,” he told the court. Also during the session, Chief Justice David Nahmias and Justice Nels Peterson repeatedly questioned Cobb County prosecutor Linda Dunikoski whether all the evidence about Harris’ deviant sexual behavior should have been allowed into evidence. All of that evidence made the same point: “This is a terrible person,” Peterson said. “And I will say you did a remarkable job of proving he’s a terrible person. But proving he is a terrible person isn’t the same as proving he murdered his child.”

On June 22, 2022, the Georgia Supreme Court reversed the convictions of 41-year-old Justin Ross Harris for the death of his 22-month-old son, Cooper, granting him a retrial.

References 

2014 in Georgia (U.S. state)
2014 murders in the United States
Deaths by person in Georgia (U.S. state)
Infanticide
June 2014 crimes in the United States
Murdered American children
Murder in Georgia (U.S. state)
Murder trials
21st-century American trials
Incidents of violence against boys